İdil District is a district of the Şırnak Province of Turkey. The seat of the district is the town of İdil and the population was 77,105 in 2021.

The district was formed in 1937.

The western part of the district is considered part of the Tur Abdin region, while the eastern part is considered part of the Bohtan region.

Settlements 
İdil District contains three beldes, sixty-five villages, of which three are unpopulated, and nineteen hamlets.

Beldes 

 İdil
 Karalar
 Sırtköy

Villages 

 Açma
 Akdağ
 Akkoyunlu
 Aksoy
 Alakamış
 Başakköy
 Bereketli
 Bozburun
 Bozkır
 Çığır
 Çınarlı
 Çukurlu
 Dirsekli
 Dumanlı
 Duruköy
 Gedik
 Güzelova
 Haberli
 Hendekköy
 Işık
 Kaşıkçı
 Kayalı
 Kayı
 Kentli
 Kırca
 Kozluca
 Köyceğiz
 Kurtuluş
 Kuyulu
 Mağaraköy
 Ocaklı
 Okçu
 Okçu
 Ortaköy
 Oyalı
 Oymak
 Ozan
 Öğündük
 Özbek
 Özen
 Peçenek
 Pınarbaşı
 Sarıköy
 Sulak
 Tekeköy
 Tepecik
 Tepeköy
 Toklu
 Topraklı
 Uçarlı
 Uğrak
 Ulak
 Üçok
 Varımlı
 Yağmurca
 Yalaz
 Yarbaşı
 Yavşan
 Yayalar
 Yaylaköy
 Yazman
 Yolaçan
 Yörük
 Yuvalı
 Yuvalı

References 

Districts of Şırnak Province
States and territories established in 1937